Erythranthe rubella is a species of monkeyflower known by the common name little redstem monkeyflower. It was formerly known as Mimulus rubellus.

Distribution
It is native to western North America, including the southwestern United States to Wyoming and Texas, and into Baja California.

Description
Erythranthe rubellus is an annual herb growing 2 to 32 centimeters tall with a very slender, red stem. The oppositely arranged oval leaves are up to 3 centimeters long and lance-shaped to oval, the lower ones borne on short petioles. The herbage is usually lightly hairy and green to reddish in color.

The petite tubular flower is no more than a centimeter long, the base of its tube encapsulated in a narrow, ribbed calyx of sepals. The flower may be yellow or pink in color and the mouth of the flower is usually dotted with red or purple.

References

External links
Jepson Manual Treatment - Mimulus rubellus
USDA Plants Profile: Mimulus rubellus
Mimulus rubellus - Photo gallery

rubella
Flora of the Southwestern United States
Flora of New Mexico
Flora of the Great Basin
Flora of the California desert regions
Flora without expected TNC conservation status